Samsul Arif Munip (born 14 January 1985) is an Indonesian professional footballer who plays as a forward for Liga 1 club Persis Solo.

International career
He made his debut for Indonesia national football team in 2014 FIFA World Cup qualification against Iran on November 15, 2011 and gave one assist on the match.

Career statistics

International

International goals

|}

Honours

Club 
Arema Cronus
 East Java Governor Cup: 2013
 Indonesian Inter Island Cup: 2014/15

Persibo Bojonegoro
 Liga Indonesia First Division: 2007
 Piala Indonesia: 2012

Individual 
 Piala Indonesia Top Goalscorer: 2008–09 (8 goals)
 Liga 1 Player of the Month: February 2022
 Liga 1 Team of the Season: 2021–22

References

External links 
 
 

1985 births
Living people
People from Bojonegoro Regency
Indonesian footballers
Indonesia international footballers
Liga 1 (Indonesia) players
Indonesian Premier Division players
Indonesian Premier League players
Persibo Bojonegoro players
Persela Lamongan players
Arema F.C. players
Persib Bandung players
PS Barito Putera players
Persita Tangerang players
Persebaya Surabaya players
Persis Solo players
Indonesia youth international footballers
Association football forwards
Sportspeople from East Java